In molecular biology, Small nucleolar RNA snoR639 (also known as snoH1) is a non-coding RNA (ncRNA) molecule which functions in the biogenesis (modification) of other small nuclear RNAs (snRNAs). This type of modifying RNA is located in the nucleolus of the eukaryotic cell which is a major site of snRNA biogenesis. It is known as a small nucleolar RNA (snoRNA) and also often referred to as a 'guide RNA'.

snoR639 was originally identified in a study of Drosophila melanogaster minifly (mfl) gene; snoR639 resides in the intron of this gene. It was later rediscovered by a large-scale RNomics effort.
snoR639 belongs to the H/ACA box class of snoRNAs as it has the predicted hairpin-hinge-hairpin-tail structure, has the conserved H/ACA-box motifs and is found associated with GAR1 protein.

References

External links 
 

Small nuclear RNA